A combination is a mathematical collection of things in a context where their specific order is irrelevant.

Combination, combinations, or combo may also refer to:

 Combination (chess), a relatively long sequence of chess moves, involving temporary loss of materials
 Combination (jump), in horseback riding
 Combination bus, a purpose-built truck with a "passenger container"
 Combination company, in the late 19th century, a touring theater company that performed only one play
 Combination Game, a style of association football based around teamwork and cooperation
 Combination meal, typically includes food items and a beverage
 Combination tone, a psychoacoustic phenomenon
 Combinations (finance), the simultaneous buying or selling of one or more options that differ in one or more of the options' variables
 Combinations (album), 2007 album by Eisley
 Striking combination, several strikes in a row in combat sports
 The Combination (film), 2009 Australian drama, directed by David Field
 The Combination, an early English football league, 1888–89 and 1890–1911

See also
Combination car (disambiguation)
Combine (disambiguation)
Combined (disambiguation)
Combo (disambiguation)
Motorcycle combination, sidecar
Original combination